Russian Route A180, also known as Narva Highway (Federal highway A180 "Narva") is a Russian federal highway that runs from Saint Petersburg through Ivangorod up to the border with Estonia by the Narva River, with the Estonian city of Narva on the opposite bank, which explains the name of the highway. It is part of European route E20, making its easternmost stretch.

Up until late 2010, it was designated as М11, which is now the number of the newly planned Moscow–Saint Petersburg motorway.

Since the 2000s the road has been being gradually reconstructed to have four lanes instead of two and to pass around the congested streets of Kransnoye Selo.

The eastern stretch of the highway adjacent to Saint Petersburg, known there as Tallinskoye Highway, is a part of World Heritage site Historic Centre of Saint Petersburg and Related Groups of Monuments due to its historical significance and multitude of cultural and historical monuments along its course.

References 

Roads in Russia
Transport in Leningrad Oblast